Mahmoud Abdel Aziz (‎; 4 June 1946 – 12 November 2016) was an Egyptian film and television actor. He became famous for several famous roles in Egyptian cinema, before becoming famous in his native Egypt and the whole region for his Egyptian patriotic role in the Egyptian TV series Raafat el-Hagan. The Egyptian Actors Guild announced his death on the night of 12 November 2016.

Early life 
Mahmoud Abdel Aziz was born in Wardeyan, a neighborhood in Alexandria, Egypt to a middle-class family. Although he was studying Agricultural Science at Alexandria University, he used to practice his acting through the university theatre.

Career 
He started his acting career by taking a role in Al Dawama TV show in the mid-1970s with Nelly and Mahmoud Yacine, after which he entered the movie industry for the first time through Al Hafeez an all-time Egyptian film classic.
Mahmoud Abdel Aziz starred in over 25 movies during the late 1970s and early 1980s; while his popularity was increasing dramatically, most of his movies at the time were categorized as romantic dramas.

His acting path matured when he started taking on different roles which really exposed his talent. He was known to be equally adept at comedy and drama.
The 1980s marked Mahmoud Abdel Aziz as a superstar when he starred in very successful movies like El Aar (1982) and El Kef (1985), and TV series such as Raafat El-Hagan (1987) which is one of the most popular works of Egyptian television based on the true story of the renowned Egyptian spy Refaat Al-Gammal who was planted in Israel for over 20 years before and after the Six-Day War.

Mahmoud Abdel Aziz had starred in over 100 movies and he manage to still surprise his audience with works such as Bab El Khalk (2012) TV Series after 7 years of absence from the Egyptian television.

Personal life 
He was married twice. First to Jelan and they had together two children, Mohamed Mahmoud Abdel Aziz, a film producer and director, and Karim Mahmoud Abdel Aziz. After their divorce, he married the Egyptian introducer, Poussy Chalabi.

His nephew Kato Hafez belongs to the music industry as a self-made songwriter and singer. He is well known in the Egyptian Arab metal scene.

Filmography

Film

Television

Awards 

 Best Actor in a movie for Kit Kat (1991) at the Damascus International Film Festival and at the Alexandria International Film Festival.
 Best Actor in a movie for The Captain (1997) at the Damascus International Film Festival.
 Best Actor in a movie for Pleasure Market (2000) at the Cairo International Film Festival.
 Best Actor in a movie for The Magician (2001) at the Damascus International Film Festival.
Life Time Achievement at the Dubai International Film Festival.

See also 
 Top 100 Egyptian films
 Soad Hosny filmography
 Salah Zulfikar filmography
 List of Egyptian films of the 1980s
 List of Egyptian films of the 1990s

References

External links
 
 Mahmoud Abdel Aziz's 76th Birthday at Google Doodle.

1946 births
2016 deaths
Egyptian male film actors
Egyptian male television actors
Egyptian comedians
People from Alexandria
Egyptian Muslims